Good Pine is an unincorporated community and census-designated place (CDP) in La Salle Parish, Louisiana, United States. It was first listed as a CDP in the 2020 census with a population of 259.

The Good Pine Lumber Company Building and the Trout-Good Pine School, which are both listed on the National Register of Historic Places, are located in Good Pine.

Demographics

2020 census

Note: the US Census treats Hispanic/Latino as an ethnic category. This table excludes Latinos from the racial categories and assigns them to a separate category. Hispanics/Latinos can be of any race.

References

Unincorporated communities in LaSalle Parish, Louisiana
Census-designated places in LaSalle Parish, Louisiana